Peavine Creek is a stream in Maries County in the U.S. state of Missouri. It is a tributary of Dry Fork.

Peavine Creek was named for pea vines near its course.

See also
List of rivers of Missouri

References

Rivers of Maries County, Missouri
Rivers of Missouri
Tributaries of the Meramec River